Maharani Mehtab Kaur ( 1782 – 1813) was the first wife of Maharaja Ranjit Singh, the founder of the Sikh Empire. She was the mother of Ranjit's reputed son, Maharaja Sher Singh, who briefly became the ruler of the Sikh Empire from 1841 until his death in 1843.

Mehtab Kaur was the only daughter of Sada Kaur and Gurbaksh Singh Kanhaiya. She was betrothed to a six-year-old Ranjit Singh at the age of four.

Mehtab Kaur was the senior-most of Ranjit Singh's wives and according to historian Jean-Marie Lafont, the only one to bear the title of Maharani (high queen) while his other wives bore the lesser title of Rani (queen). After her death, the title was held by Ranjit's second wife and mother of his heir apparent Maharaja Kharak Singh, Datar Kaur. After her death the title was passed down to Ranjit's youngest widow Jind Kaur, who served as regent of the Sikh Empire (after Sher Singh's death) from 1843 till 1846 and was the mother of  Maharaja Duleep Singh.

Family
Mehtab Kaur, the only child of Gurbaksh Singh Kanhaiya (Sandhu) and his wife Sada Kaur Dhaliwal, was born in 1782. Upon her birth she was named "Mehtab" (مهتاب) which means 'moonlight' or 'splendor of the moon' in Persian due to her fair and clear complexion. Her father, Gurbaksh Singh, was the heir of Jai Singh Kanhaiya (a Sandhu Jat), the founder and chief of the Kanhaiya Misl.

The Kanhaiya Misl, who had replaced the Bhangis as the most powerful misl, disputed Ranjit Singh's father's (Maha Singh) right to plunder Jammu, and in one of the many skirmishes between the two misls, Gurbaksh Singh was killed in battle against Maha Singh in February 1785.

Mehtab Kaur's mother, Rani Sada Kaur, an intelligent, high spirited and ambitious woman, used to lend support of the Kanhaiya misl to Ranjit Singh till 1821, when she developed differences with him and as a consequence lost her territory to him.

Marriage

Jai Singh disagreed to betroth his granddaughter, Mehtab Kaur, to Maha Singh's son, Ranjit Singh, but was persuaded by his widowed daughter-in-law, Sada Kaur to agree to the match. The Kanhaiya chief died shortly afterwards in 1789, leaving his estates to Sada Kaur who took over the leadership of the Kanhaiya Misl. The same year the young Mehtab Kaur and Ranjit Singh were betrothed and married. The Muklawa happened in 1796.

As a teenager, Ranjit Singh took hardly any interest in the affairs of the state, making his mother, Raj Kaur, anxious for his future. She felt that marriage might bring him around to the responsibilities of life. She approached Sada Kaur to fix the muklawa (tradition where the wife goes back to her maternal home) date. Ranjit was fifteen years old when he left Gujranwala for Batala, the chief town of the Kanhaiyas, to perform the after marriage rituals with Mehtab Kaur in 1796. This alliance between the two important Sikh families was a major event for Punjab. All the leading Sikh chiefs were present at the wedding. Mehtab Kaur was very beautiful and her looks made her seem mismatched for the rugged Ranjit Singh. Even if Mehtab Kaur could reconcile herself to her husband's looks, it must have been difficult for her to forget that her father was killed in battle with Ranjit Singh's father. Plus she was haughty and self-willed, a proud woman born to rich parents while Ranjit Singh was a typically simple Punjabi man, rustic in his habits. It was a marriage of convenience for both and they rarely stayed together.

After entering into a matrimonial alliance with the Kanhaiya Misl, Ranjit Singh wanted to consolidate his position further which could only be done by drawing some other misl to his side. He made suggestions to head of the Nakais and early in 1797 took a second wife, who was the sister of the Nakai Sardar Gyan Singh Sandhu- with whom he was betrothed to for some time. The marriage turned out to be more successful than the first. His second wife bore his mother's name: Raj Kaur. She was renamed Datar Kaur and was warmly known as Mai Nakain and turned into Ranjit's most loved wife.

Ranjit's second marriage and his little interest in her gave Mehtab Kaur an excuse to return to Batala. From there on she made only occasional appearances at her husband's home and Ranjit Singh irregularly visited her in Batala.

The second marriage took place under the guardianship of Raj Kaur and Sada Kaur in 1792; Sada Kaur accommodated herself to Ranjit's second marriage as she had set her heart on greater and better things. She made laid out plans which Ranjit Singh followed, she hoped to use her influence on him to secure the future of her daughter, her future children as well as the Kanhaiya Misl.

Ranjit Singh's second wife, Datar Kaur bore him his first son and heir, Kharak Singh in 1801. With this Sada Kaur left Ranjit Singh's side and returned to her home in Batala, taking her daughter with her, her plans to secure the future of her daughter and the Kanhaiyas in tatters.

Issue

Sada Kaur kept on trying to bring Ranjit Singh closer to her daughter and felt happy when Mehtab bore Ranjit his second son (and her first child) in 1804. Thanking God (Ishwar) the child was named Ishar Singh. The prince died in infancy - at the age of one and a half years. Mehtab Kaur was pregnant again in 1807 and gave birth to twin sons, Sher Singh and Tara Singh in Batala. Ranjit was near Jawalamukhi when he received the news of their birth, he rushed to Amritsar to pay a thanksgiving visit to the Golden Temple there. The birth of his sons was celebrated greatly. There was cheering in the illustrious camp and when Ranjit returned to Lahore, he gave away vast entire-ties in philanthropy and the city was enlightened for a few nights.

Historians differ over whether Sher Singh and Tara Singh were Ranjit Singh's biological sons. During March 1837, on the occasion of the marriage of Kanwar Nau Nihal Singh, Henry Edward Fane, the nephew and aide-de-camp to the Commander-in-Chief, India, General Sir Henry Fane, who spent several days in Ranjit Singh's company, reported that the Maharaja never thoroughly acknowledged Sher Singh. The contemporary historian, Joseph Davey Cunningham, who attended the 1838 conversations between Ranjita Singh and Lord Auckland, also recorded that the Maharaja had doubts. 
However, Khushwant Singh, writing in 1962, considered that the rumours regarding the parentage of Sher Singh and Tara Singh were inaccurate and had been spread by Kharak Singh and his mother, Datar Kaur, in order to reduce the possibility of Ranjit Singh preferring Sher Singh, who was fast becoming his father's favourite. Sohan Lal Suri, the official court biographer too notes that Sher Singh and Tara Singh were not the biological sons of Ranjit Singh in his Umdat ut-tawarikh. Despite his doubts, Ranjit Singh gave Sher Singh commands in the army and conferred honours on him, although Kharak Singh remained his favourite.  However, no honours were bestowed on Tara Singh and he was not permitted to appear in court.

Death
After suffering from a failing health, Mehtab Kaur died in 1813. At the time of her death, Ranjit Singh was at Amritsar, where the death of the former had taken place. Ranjit Singh did not go to the incineration and other condolatory functions. After a ton of claims and influences, Dewan Mokham Chand could take the Maharaja to Sada Kaur's derah, where he played out a portion of the critical functions of condolence.

In popular culture
Mehtab Kaur is portrayed in the TV series  Maharaja Ranjit Singh.
A teenage Mehtab Kaur is portrayed by Tunisha Sharma in Life OK's historical drama Sher-e-Punjab: Maharaja Ranjit Singh.

See also
Sher Singh
Kanhaiya Misl

References

Bibliography

Women of the Sikh Empire
1782 births
1813 deaths
Indian queen consorts
19th-century Indian women
19th-century Indian people
18th-century Indian women
18th-century Indian people
Punjabi people